Madhavaram Depot metro station is a metro railway station on the Red Line of the Chennai Metro. The station is the only at-grade station of the Chennai Metro, and one of the 48 stations of the Madhavaram Milk Colony–Sholinganallur stretch. The station serves the neighbourhoods of Madhavaram.

History
Construction of the station began in 2021.

Depot
The Madhavaram Depot metro station will feature a depot, which will be one of the five depots of the Chennai Metro.

See also
 List of Chennai metro stations
 Railway stations in Chennai
 Transport in Chennai
 Urban rail transit in India
 List of metro systems

References

External links

 
 UrbanRail.Net – descriptions of all metro systems in the world, each with a schematic map showing all stations.

Chennai Metro stations
Railway stations in Chennai